Yeolmbridge is a village in Cornwall (but within the boundaries of the historic county of Devon), two and a half miles north of Launceston.

Yeolm Bridge 

The village takes its name from the bridge, Yeolm Bridge which crosses the River Ottery and is Grade I listed and a Scheduled Ancient Monument. Built about 1350, it is considered the oldest surviving and best built of medieval Cornish bridges. In 1951 Nikolaus Pevsner described it as Cornwall's "most ambitious" bridge.

Quarry 
Yeolmbridge Quarry SSSI is 250 m to the east of the village. The quarry is designated a Site of Special Scientific Interest and a Geological Conservation Review (GCR) site, as the type–locality of the Yeolmbridge Formation; a black shale which shows the Devonian–Carboniferous boundary around 359 million years ago with a sequence of fossils.

Notable people
Joan Rendell, an English historian, writer and phillumenist, was resident at Yeolmbridge in the latter part of her life.

References

Villages in Cornwall
Sites of Special Scientific Interest in Cornwall
Sites of Special Scientific Interest notified in 1990